The eighth season of the obstacle course reality competition series American Ninja Warrior premiered on June 1, 2016, on NBC. Hosts Matt Iseman and Akbar Gbaja-Biamila returned for their respective seventh and fourth seasons, alongside sideline reporter Kristine Leahy who returned for her second season. The grand prize stayed even with season 7, at $1,000,000. In addition, 28 new obstacles were created for this season, and there were 40% more female applicants over last season.

Competition schedule

Obstacles

City Qualifying & Finals

National Finals

City courses

Los Angeles

Qualifying
The Los Angeles Qualifying round featured four new or modified obstacles and concluded with 17 finishers. Both Jessie Graff and Natalie Duran made it to the Warped Wall, and Jessie got a buzzer while Natalie failed in the qualifying round. In addition, the Facebook video showcasing Graff's qualifying run was viewed more than 50 million times leading up to the Finals round. Kevin Bull earned the "POM Wonderful Run of the Night" with the fastest time (2:02.81). Additionally, actor Brennan Mejia, the Red Power Ranger from Power Rangers Dino Super Charge, failed on the second obstacle again.

Obstacles used during Los Angeles Qualifying are listed below.

Competitors who advanced to the City Finals are listed below.

Finals
The Los Angeles Finals round featured one new obstacle, The Wedge, as well as three modified obstacles from city qualifying. The round concluded with one finisher, the lowest number of any final to date unless the chance of a non-completed course. Rock climber and engineering student Josh Levin, who was a rookie, earned the "POM Wonderful Run of the Night" and the only finish, with a time of 8:21.30. Jessie Graff came in second place, breaking her own record for the highest finish by a woman in a city competition.

Obstacles used during the Los Angeles Finals are listed below.

Competitors who advanced to the Vegas Finals are listed below.

Atlanta

Qualifying
The Atlanta Qualifying round featured three new or modified obstacles and concluded with 27 finishers. Gym owner Drew Drechsel earned the "POM Wonderful Run of the Night" with the fastest time (1:19.44).

Obstacles used during Atlanta Qualifying are listed below.

Competitors who advanced to the City Finals are listed below.

Finals
The Atlanta Finals round featured one new obstacle, The Clacker, as well as two modified obstacles from city qualifying. The round concluded with four finishers. Stock trader and ANW veteran Travis Rosen, earned the "POM Wonderful Run of the Night" with a time of 6:52.17, coming in third place. Roommates James McGrath and Drew Drechsel competed for the fastest time of the night when they came in first and second place, with times of 5:01.62 (McGrath) and 5:05.26 (Drechsel). After competing since the premiere season in 2009, parkour trainer and original ANW veteran Brett Sims made it to his first Vegas final with a time of 7:36.45, ending up in 4th place. During Drew Drechsel's run, Lucas Gomes was "on the bubble" in 15th Place, meaning if Drew got past the 8th obstacle, he would be eliminated in 16th place. He ended up in 16th, behind Todd Bourgeois. Someone got injured before Las Vegas so he did get in the top 15.

Obstacles used during the Atlanta Finals are listed below.

Competitors who advanced to the Vegas Finals are listed below.

Lucas Gomes was brought back as a wildcard and an injury replacement for Tyler Martin.

Indianapolis

Qualifying
The Indianapolis Qualifying round featured four new or modified obstacles and concluded with 25 finishers. Rock Climbing coach Meagan Martin was the only woman to advance to the city finals, earned the "POM Wonderful Run of the Night" with a time of 6:30.08. She became the first woman to scale the warped wall three years in a row. The Indianapolis round also featured IndyCar drivers Hélio Castroneves, Tony Kanaan, and Josef Newgarden as well as NASCAR driver and 2-time Xfinity Series champ Ricky Stenhouse Jr. and one-legged wrestler Zach Gowen. However, none ended up moving on to the Indianapolis city finals. This was the first time ever that the course was built in a curve.

Obstacles used during Indianapolis Qualifying are listed below.

Competitors who advanced to the City Finals are listed below.

Finals
The Indianapolis Finals round featured one new obstacle, Circuit Board, and three modified obstacles from the qualifying round. The round concluded with four finishers. Wedding photographer Jake Murray earned the "POM Wonderful Run of the Night" with a time of 6:34.68, coming in second place. The fastest time of the night went to maintenance technician Adam Arnold, with a first place time of 5:40.42. Even though she failed on the Circuit Board obstacle, rock climbing coach Meagan Martin became the second woman to make it to the Las Vegas finals with a time of 7:31.83, finishing in 8th place. This was Meagan's first time on a back half of a Finals course and first time qualifying for the National Finals in Las Vegas.

Obstacles used during the Indianapolis Finals are listed below.

Competitors who advanced to the Vegas Finals are listed below.

Oklahoma City

Qualifying
The Oklahoma City Qualifying round featured three new or modified obstacles and concluded with 15 finishers. Even though personal trainer Artis Thompson III didn't advance to the city finals, he earned the "POM Wonderful Run of the Night" for making it to the end of the fourth obstacle, the Tire Swing with a prosthetic leg. The Oklahoma City qualifying round also featured Kacy Catanzaro, Brent Steffensen, Sam Sann, Daniel Gil and Lance Pekus. Two of them ended up moving on to the Oklahoma City finals. However, Kacy Catanzaro failed on only the third obstacle, the Log Runner. Despite this, she was once again wild-carded to the Las Vegas finals.
Pekus and Sann failed on the Log Runner and the Tire Swing, respectively. Additionally, basketball player, Flip White Jr. from the Harlem Globetrotters, made an appearance.

Obstacles used during Oklahoma City Qualifying are listed below.

Competitors who advanced to the City Finals are listed below.

Finals
The Oklahoma City Finals round featured one new obstacle, Window Hang, and two modified obstacles from the qualifying round. The round concluded with two finishers. Bank manager Grant Clinton who suffered a stroke just 6 months ago earned the "POM Wonderful Run of the Night" with a time of 5:57.43, coming in second place. The fastest time of the night went to ninja trainer Daniel Gil, with a first place time of 5:14.27. Also, 54-year-old construction manager Jon Stewart edged out veteran "The Godfather" David Campbell, who had advanced to Mount Midoryama in all seven previous seasons. Even though Stewart failed on the Window Hang, he earned a spot in the Las Vegas finals with a time of 3:41.71, ending up in 5th place.

Obstacles used during the Oklahoma City Finals are listed below.

Competitors who advanced to the Vegas Finals are listed below.

Philadelphia

Qualifying
The Philadelphia Qualifying round featured two new or modified obstacles and concluded with 9 finishers. High school track coach and ANW rookie Anthony DeFranco earned the "POM Wonderful Run of the Night" with the fastest time (1:44.37). Michelle Warnky, Jesse Labreck, Rachael Goldstein and Allyssa Beird, who finished 17th, 28th, 29th and 30th respectively, all moved on to the city finals - the first time four women made it into the a city qualifier Top 30 in ANW history. Other competitors also included Geoff Britten, who continued his streak of hitting every course buzzer, as well as veterans Joe Moravsky, Ryan Stratis, and Jamie Rahn, who all moved on to the city finals.

Obstacles used during Philadelphia Qualifying are listed below.

Competitors who advanced to the City Finals are listed below.

Finals
The Philadelphia Finals featured one new obstacle, the Stair Hopper and one modified obstacle from the qualifying round. Weatherman Joe Moravsky and gym owner Chris Wilczewski made it the farthest by nearly completing the Invisible Ladder; for the first time in ANW history, the city finals had no finishers, making it the hardest course in the series history. Caregiver Jesse "Flex" Labreck earned the POM Wonderful Run of the Night, becoming only the 3rd woman in Season 8 to advance to the Las Vegas finals and the 5th woman ever to scale the Warped Wall in ANW regular competition.

Obstacles used during the Philadelphia Finals are listed below.

Competitors who advanced to the Vegas Finals are listed below.

City Qualifying Leaderboard

City Finals Leaderboard

National Finals
The National Finals were held along the Las Vegas strip, as has been the case since the series set up its own finals course instead of sending competitors to Japan.

Stage 1
During the first episode of Stage 1, Jessie Graff became the first woman ever to successfully complete Stage 1 and advance to Stage 2. She placed 5th overall with a time of 2:07.61. She is the first woman in ANW history to make it to Stage 2. During the second episode of Stage 1, Jake Murray placed 1st overall with the fastest time of 1:45.25. Dan Polizzi, Nick Hanson, and Nick Kostreski cleared all the obstacles, but ran out of time before they could hit the buzzer at the end of Stage 1. Brent Steffensen, Travis Rosen, Ryan Stratis, James McGrath, Jamie Rahn, Mike Bernardo, Kevin Bull, Ian Dory, Jo Jo Bynum, and Geoff Britten surprisingly went out early on Stage 1 this season. Only a record-low 17 finishers have successfully completed the course.

Stage 1 featured four new obstacles, Snake Run, the Giant Log Grip, the Broken Bridge and the Flying Squirrel.

Competitors who completed Stage 1 are listed below.

Stage 2

Stage 2 featured five new obstacles, the Giant Ring Swing, the Down Up Salmon Ladder, the Wave Runner, the Double Wedge, and the Wall Flip.

 Indicates competitor completed the course.
 Indicates competitor was awarded the "POM Wonderful Run of the Night."

 

 * Drew Drechsel was awarded the "POM Wonderful Run of the Night."

Leaderboard

Stage 3

Stage 3 featured two new obstacles, the Keylock Hang and the Curved Body Prop

U.S. Nielsen ratings

References

American Ninja Warrior
2016 American television seasons